Copyright. Plagios literarios y poder político al desnudo (Copyright. Literary plagiarism and political power naked) is an Argentine novel by Luis Pescetti.  It was first published in 2001.

This book was published by Plaza & Janes in Buenos Aires, Argentina in 2001 and then by the Alfaguara publishing house in his collection "Point of reading." Also was published by Alfaguara in Mexico.

2001 Argentine novels
Books by Luis Pescetti